George Pickering (1832 – 1 December 1858) was an Australian cricketer. He played one first-class cricket match for Victoria in 1858. His preferred batting style was left-handed batting.

See also
 List of Victoria first-class cricketers

References

1832 births
1858 deaths
Australian cricketers
Victoria cricketers
Cricketers from Sydney